In computing, a composite application is a software application built by combining multiple existing functions into a new application. The technical concept can be compared to mashups. However, composite applications use business sources (e.g., existing modules or even Web services ) of information, while mashups usually rely on web-based, and often free, sources. 

It is wrong to assume that composite applications are by definition part of a service-oriented architecture (SOA). Composite applications can be built using any technology or architecture.

A composite application consists of functionality drawn from several different sources. The components may be individual selected functions from within other applications, or entire systems whose outputs have been packaged as business functions, modules, or web services.

Composite applications often incorporate orchestration of "local" application logic to control how the composed functions interact with each other to produce the new, derived functionality. For composite applications that are based on SOA, WS-CAF is a Web services standard for composite applications.

See also
Web 2.0
Composite Application Service Assembly (CASA)
Enterprise service bus (ESB)
Service-oriented architecture (SOA)
Service component architecture (SCA)
Mashup (web application hybrid)

External links
 Composite application guidance from patterns & practices
 NetBeans SOA Composite Application Project Home
 camelse
 Running Apache Camel in OpenESB
 eclipse sirius - Free and GPL eclipse tool to build your own arbitrary complex military grade modeling tools on one hour
 eclipse SCA Tools - Gnu free composite tool
 Free GPL obeodesigner made with eclipse sirius

References

Web services
Service-oriented (business computing)